Irakli Liluashvili (born 13 October 1984) is a Georgian footballer who recently played for Umaglesi Liga club Chikhura Sachkhere.

He played for Nitra in the 2008 UEFA Intertoto Cup.

References

External links

1984 births
Living people
Footballers from Georgia (country)
Association football forwards
FC Zorya Luhansk players
FC Dinamo Tbilisi players
FC Nitra players
MFK Zemplín Michalovce players
Slovak Super Liga players
2. Liga (Slovakia) players
Expatriate footballers in Slovakia
Expatriate sportspeople from Georgia (country) in Slovakia
FC Chikhura Sachkhere players